Pan Am Flight 759 was a regularly scheduled domestic passenger flight from Miami to San Diego, with en route stops in New Orleans and Las Vegas. On July 9, 1982, the Boeing 727 flying this route crashed in the New Orleans suburb of Kenner after being forced down by a microburst shortly after takeoff. All 145 on board, as well as 8 people on the ground, were killed.

Aircraft and crew
The aircraft involved, a 14-year-old Boeing 727-235, registration N4737, construction number 19457/518, was delivered to National Airlines on January 31, 1968. The aircraft was powered by three Pratt & Whitney JT8D-7B turbofan engines, and was renamed from 37 Susan/Erica to Clipper Defiance after National was merged with Pan Am.

At the time of accident, the aircraft was carrying 137 passengers and one non-revenue passenger in the cockpit jumpseat, along with a crew of seven. The captain was 45-year-old Kenneth L. McCullers, who had 11,727 flying hours, including 10,595 hours on the Boeing 727. McCullers was described by others as an "above average" pilot, who was "comfortable" to fly with because of his excellent judgement and ability to exercise command. The First Officer was 32-year-old Donald G. Pierce, who had 6,127 flying hours, including 3,914 hours on the Boeing 727. Pierce was described by other captains as a conscientious pilot with excellent knowledge of aircraft systems and company flight procedures and techniques. The flight engineer was 60-year-old Leo B. Noone, who had 19,904 flying hours, including 10,508 hours on the Boeing 727. All three flight crew, including the captain, the first officer and the second officer, were reported having no sleep or health problems, and had passed all proficiency checks without issues.

Accident 
The weather forecast issued at 07:40 on July 9 by the New Orleans National Meteorological Center contained thunderstorms, possible severe turbulence, icing, and wind shear. No fronts or low pressure areas were within  of the airport. According to the NWS (National Weather Service), there were no severe weather warnings for the time and area of the accident.

Flight 759 began its takeoff from Runway 10 at the New Orleans International Airport (now Louis Armstrong New Orleans International), in Kenner, Louisiana at 16:07:57 central daylight time, bound for Las Vegas, Nevada. At the time of Flight 759's takeoff, there were thunderstorms over the east of the airport and east-northeast of the departure end of runway 10. The winds were reported to be "gusty and swirling." First officer Pierce was the pilot flying and captain McCullers was the pilot monitoring, as recorded on the aircraft's cockpit voice recorder (CVR):

The aircraft continued descending for another , hitting trees and houses.

The aircraft was destroyed by the impact, explosion, and subsequent ground fire. A total of 153 people were killed (all 145 passengers and crew on board and 8 on the ground). Another 4 people on the ground sustained injuries. In one of the destroyed houses, a 16-month-old baby girl was discovered in a crib covered with debris that protected her from the flames, sustaining only minor burns. The child's mother and 4-year-old sister were killed; the father was at work when the accident occurred. In total, six houses were destroyed; five houses were damaged substantially.

Investigation
The National Transportation Safety Board (NTSB) determined that the probable cause of the accident was the aircraft's encounter with microburst-induced wind shear during the liftoff, which imposed a downdraft and a decreasing headwind, the effects of which the pilot would have had difficulty recognizing and reacting to in time for the aircraft's descent to be stopped before its impact with trees. Contributing to the accident was the limited capability of then current wind shear detection technology. The investigation noted the failure of the US Government to "put out proper weather information that day and to maintain wind shear detection devices at the airport." The New York Times reported that:

According to witnesses, a wind shear alert was mentioned on New Orleans Airport radio frequencies on July 9, before Flight 759 took off. But the flight crew had been briefed with a recorded weather advisory that was two hours old, though airport routine is for hourly recordings of weather information. There were no procedures at the airport for advising flight crews that updated weather announcements were available.

As a result, millions of dollars were paid out as compensation to various families affected by the crash. Flight 759, along with Delta Air Lines Flight 191 which crashed due to similar circumstances three years later, led to the development of the Airborne wind shear detection and alert system and the Federal Aviation Administration mandate to install windshear detection systems at airports and on board aircraft in the U.S. by 1993.

Victims

Nationalities of passenger, crew and ground fatalities

A memorial to the accident is located at Our Lady of Perpetual Help Church in Kenner, Louisiana.

Media
Royd Anderson wrote and produced a documentary on the crash in 2012.

See also
Delta Air Lines Flight 191
Eastern Air Lines Flight 66
 Martinair Flight 495
 USAir Flight 1016
United Nations Flight 834
1956 Kano Airport BOAC Argonaut crash
Aeroméxico Connect Flight 2431
1950 Air France multiple Douglas DC-4 accidents

Notes

References

External links

 The Times-Picayune 1982: Pan Am Flight 759 crashes in Kenner

Aviation accidents and incidents in the United States in 1982
Accidents and incidents involving the Boeing 727
1982 meteorology
1982 in Louisiana
Airliner accidents and incidents in Louisiana
Airliner accidents and incidents caused by microbursts
20th century in New Orleans
759
Disasters in Louisiana
Jefferson Parish, Louisiana
July 1982 events in the United States
Airliner accidents and incidents caused by weather